Moraczewski (feminine: Moraczewska, plural: Moraczewscy) is a Polish surname. It may refer to:

Jędrzej Moraczewski (1870-1944), Polish politician
Zofia Moraczewska (1873-1958), Polish politician
Maciej Moraczewski (1840-1928), Polish architect

Polish-language surnames